Jim Rasenberger is an American writer, born in Washington, D.C. and living in New York City. He has published three books, and contributed to many publications, especially the New York Times, Vanity Fair, and Smithsonian.

In February 2004, Rasenberger wrote an influential article that was published by the New York Times about the 1964 murder of Kitty Genovese. Rasenberger's article revealed that the original March 27, 1964, news story about the murder had been exaggerated by A. M. Rosenthal, metropolitan editor for the New York Times, contained multiple inaccuracies, including factually incorrect reporting that none of the 37 witnesses rendered aid or even called police. Rasenberger's article also featured an interview with Genovese's roommate, Mary Ann Zielonko, who revealed that she and Kitty had been lovers.

Rasenberger's book The Brilliant Disaster about the Bay of Pigs Invasion during JFK's administration, was named by Kirkus Reviews as one of the best nonfiction books of 2011. The Miami Herald pointed out that while Rasenberger had a personal connection to the story—his father was a lawyer who aided the Kennedy brothers’ efforts to free the jailed Cuban rebels—“he is no apologist for the administration; he concedes the arrogance and incompetence that blinded the so-called best and brightest to the invasion plan’s glaring flaws.”

Rasenberger is a graduate of Dartmouth College.

Publications
 The Brilliant Disaster: JFK, Castro, and America's Doomed Invasion of Cuba's Bay of Pigs  New York: Scribner, 2011. In over 900 libraries according to WorldCat
 America, 1908: The Dawn of Flight, the Race to the Pole, the Invention of the Model T, and the Making of a Modern Nation New York: Scribner, 2007. In over 700 libraries according to WorldCat
 High Steel: The Daring Men who Built the World's Greatest Skyline New York, NY: Harper Collins, 2004. In over 500 libraries according to WorldCat

References

American male non-fiction writers
21st-century American historians
21st-century American male writers
Year of birth missing (living people)
Living people
Writers from Washington, D.C.
Dartmouth College alumni